Rohdea japonica is a species of plant native to Japan, China and Korea. Common names include Nippon lily, sacred lily, and Japanese sacred lily.

It is a rhizomatous herbaceous perennial plant, with fibrous roots. The leaves are evergreen, broad lanceolate, 15–50 cm long and 2.5–7 cm broad, with an acute apex. The flowers are produced in a short, stout, dense spike 3–4 cm long, each flower pale yellowish, 4–5 mm long. The fruit is a red berry 8 mm diameter, produced in a tight cluster of several together.

Cultivation and uses

It is cultivated as an ornamental plant. In Chinese it is called wan nian qing (simplified: 万年青; traditional: 萬年青; lit. "evergreen"), and for this reason has been used symbolically in visual culture (e.g. on Mao badges ). In Japanese it is called omoto.

The plant is also used in traditional Chinese medicine, though it is generally regarded as inedible and possibly toxic.

References

External links
 
 
Flora of China: Rohdea japonica

Plants for a Future: Rohdea japonica

Nolinoideae
Flora of Japan
Flora of China
Flora of Korea
Plants described in 1784